The 2015 ATP Challenger China International – Nanchang was a professional tennis tournament played on hard courts. It was the second edition of the tournament which was part of the 2015 ATP Challenger Tour. It took place in Nanchang, China between 14 and 20 September 2015.

Singles main-draw entrants

Seeds

 1 Rankings are as of September 7, 2015.

Other entrants
The following players received wildcards into the singles main draw:
  He Yecong
  Yuqing Ning
  Zhuoyang Qiu
  Zhicheng Zhu

The following player received entry courtesy of a protected ranking:
  Amir Weintraub

The following player received entry by a special exemption:
  Daniil Medvedev

The following players received entry from the qualifying draw:
  Sriram Balaji
  Riccardo Ghedin
  Jeevan Nedunchezhiyan
  Finn Tearney

The following player received entry as a lucky loser:
  Dane Propoggia

Doubles main-draw entrants

Seeds

1 Rankings as of September 7, 2015.

Other entrants
The following pairs received wildcards into the doubles main draw:
  He Feng /  Yuqing Ning
  He Yecong /  Zhuoyang Qiu
  Daniil Medvedev /  Zhang Zhizhen

Champions

Singles

  Peter Gojowczyk def.  Amir Weintraub, 6–2, 6–1

Doubles

 Jonathan Eysseric /  Jürgen Zopp def.  Lee Hsin-han /  Amir Weintraub, 6–4, 6–2

External links
Official website

2015 ATP Challenger Tour
ATP Challenger China International – Nanchang